The 1906 Latrobe Athletic Association season was their eleventh season in existence. The team finished 3-1.

Schedule

Game notes

References

Latrobe Athletic Association
Latrobe Athletic Association seasons